Ganglioneuroblastoma is a variant of neuroblastoma that is surrounded by ganglion cells.

It can be difficult to diagnose.

Nodular ganglioneuroblastoma can be divided by prognosis.

Neuroblastic tumors
It is contained within the neuroblastic tumors group, which includes:
 Ganglioneuroma (benign)
 Ganglioneuroblastoma (intermediate).
 Neuroblastoma (aggressive)

See also 
 Neuroblastoma

References

External links 

Nervous system neoplasia